Alon is an Israeli surname and masculine given name, which means "oak tree" in the Hebrew language. Variants of the name include Allon, Elon and Ilan, which have their separate pages. The name may refer to:

Given name
Alon Abutbul (born 1965), Israeli actor
Alon Badat (born 1989), Israeli footballer
Alon Bar (born 1966), Israeli filmmaker
Alon Bement (1876–1954), American artist, arts administrator, author, and educator.
Alon Ben David (born 1967), Israeli journalist
Alon Ben-Meir (born 1937), American writer
Alon Carmeli (born 1964), Israeli businessman
Alon Chen (born 1970), Israeli neuroscientist; 11th President of the Weizmann Institute of Science
Alon Davidi (born 1973), Israeli politician
Alon Day (born 1991), Israeli racing driver
Alon De Loco (born 1974), Israeli musician
Alon Eizenman (born 1979), Israeli ice hockey player
Alon Harazi (born 1971), Israeli football player
Alon Harel (born 1974), Israeli legal scholar
Alon Hazan (born 1967), Israeli football player and coach
Alon Hilu (born 1972), Israeli novelist
Alon Leichman (born 1989), Israeli Olympian, member of the Israel national baseball team, and assistant pitching coach for the Cincinnati Reds
Alon Mandel (born 1988), Israeli swimmer
Alon Mizrahi (born 1971), Israeli football player
Alon Pinkas (born 1961), Israeli diplomat
Alon Stein (born 1978), Israeli basketball player
Alon Tal (born 1960), Israeli environmentalist and politician
Alon Turgeman (born 1978), Israeli basketball player and coach
Alon Wieland (1935-2022), American businessman and politician
Alon Yefet (born 1972), Israeli football referee

Surname
Azaria Alon (1918–2014), Israeli environmentalist
Dan Alon (1945–2018), Israeli fencer
Gedaliah Alon (1901–1950), Israeli historian
Geva Alon (born 1979), Israeli musician
Modi Alon (1921–1948), Israeli fighter pilot 
Nir Alon (born 1964), Israeli sculptor
Nitzan Alon (born 1964), Israeli general 
Noga Alon (born 1956), Israeli mathematician
Roy Alon (1942–2006), British stuntman
Uri Alon (born 1969), Israeli scientist
Yosef Alon (1929–1973), Israeli diplomat

See also
Alon (disambiguation)
Allon (surname)
Elon (name)
Ilan (name)

Hebrew masculine given names
Hebrew-language surnames